Coca-Cola with Lemon is a soft drink brand owned by The Coca-Cola Company, launched to compete with Pepsi Twist. It is produced and distributed by The Coca-Cola Company's bottlers. Diet Coke with Lemon was introduced in the United States in 2001, and is still available as a semi sugar free version in Coca-Cola Freestyle machines.

Production and distribution
Coca-Cola Light with Lemon is still available in:

 Austria
 Belgium
 Bosnia and Herzegovina
 Brazil (as limited edition for the first semester of 2017).
 Bulgaria
 China
 Croatia (as Lemon Zero Sugar)
 Czech Republic (as Lemon Zero Sugar)
 Denmark (as Lemon Zero Sugar)
 Finland (as Lemon Zero Sugar)
 France
 Germany
 Greece (as Lemon Zero Sugar)
 Hungary (from 2018 as Lemon Zero Sugar) (and with sugar as 2022) 
 Iceland
 Italy (from 2017)
 Japan
 Korea
 Luxembourg
 Macau
 Netherlands
 New Caledonia
 Norway 
 Portugal
 Reunion
 Russia (as Lemon No Sugar, introduced in 2022)
 Serbia (as Lemon Zero Sugar introduced in May 2019)
 Singapore
 Slovenia
 Spain
 Sweden (Returned in 2020)
 Switzerland
 Taiwan
 Tunisia
 Ukraine (2017)
 West Bank Gaza

Coca-Cola Light with Lemon has been discontinued in:
 Australia (returned in November 2013, and sold for limited time only, until discontinued)
 Canada
 Chile
 Denmark (2006) (Returned in 2019 with a zero variant instead)
 Finland (returned in March 2019)
 Ireland
 Israel
 Mexico
 New Zealand
 United Kingdom (as Diet Coke with Lemon was discontinued in the beginning of 2006)

In July 2014, Coca-Cola with Lemon was temporarily restocked in Japan. The product went to 16,622 different stores of 7-Eleven throughout Japan. The bottle was reintroduced with new packaging, and was only on shelves until supplies lasted. There are different variations of the drink, one being Coca-Cola Lemon Zero Sugar. This drink is only exclusive only to Italy. The drink is sold in a glass bottle, PET, and aluminium cans.

References

Coca-Cola brands
Food and drink introduced in 2001
Lemon sodas